Deland McCullough  (born Jon Briggs on December 1, 1972) is a former American and Canadian football running back in the National Football League (NFL) and Canadian Football League (CFL). He is currently the running backs coach at the University of Notre Dame. He played for the Cincinnati Bengals and Winnipeg Blue Bombers. He played college football at Miami University. In 2020, McCullough won his first Super Bowl when the Chiefs defeated the San Francisco 49ers 31–20 in Super Bowl LIV.

Career
In 2020, while working as the running backs coach for the Kansas City Chiefs, McCullough won his first Super Bowl when the Chiefs defeated the San Francisco 49ers 31–20 in Super Bowl LIV.

On February 8, 2021, McCullough was hired at Indiana University as their running backs coach.

In February 2022, Notre Dame hired McCullough as their new running backs coach.

Personal life
McCullough, born Jon Briggs, was placed for adoption as a newborn, but reunited with his biological mother in November 2017. He found out from her that his mentor, Sherman Smith, is his biological father,as depicted in the Kendrick Brothers 2021 film, Show Me the Father.

McCullough has four sons; Deland II, Dasan, Daeh, and Diem. Deland II and Dasan are currently on the Indiana Hoosiers football team.

References

External links
Indiana Hoosiers bio

1972 births
Living people
Players of American football from Pittsburgh
American football running backs
Canadian football running backs
Miami RedHawks football players
Cincinnati Bengals players
Winnipeg Blue Bombers players
Indiana Hoosiers football coaches
Miami RedHawks football coaches
USC Trojans football coaches
Kansas City Chiefs coaches
Philadelphia Eagles players